Slim Whitman Sings is a studio album by Slim Whitman, released in early 1957 on Imperial Records.

Release history 
The album was issued in the United States by Imperial Records as a 12-inch long-playing record, catalog number LP 9026.

Around 1966, it was reissued under the title Country Hits, Volume 1.

Track listing

References 

1957 albums
Slim Whitman albums
Imperial Records albums